
The following are lists of Walt Disney Studios films by decade:

Lists 
List of Walt Disney Studios films (1937–1959)
List of Walt Disney Studios films (1960–1979)
List of Walt Disney Studios films (1980–1989)
List of Walt Disney Studios films (1990–1999)
List of Walt Disney Studios films (2000–2009)
List of Walt Disney Studios films (2010–2019)
List of Walt Disney Studios films (2020–2029)

See also
 List of Disney feature-length home entertainment releases
 List of Disney television films
 List of Disney+ original films
 List of Disney television series
 List of Hollywood Pictures films
 List of films released by Lucasfilm
 List of Marvel Studios films
 List of Fox Film films
 List of Twentieth Century Pictures films
 List of 20th Century Fox films (1935–1999)
 List of 20th Century Fox films (2000–2020)
 List of Fox Searchlight Pictures films (1995–1999)
 List of Fox Searchlight Pictures films (2000–2009)
 List of Fox Searchlight Pictures films (2010–2019)
 List of Fox Star Studios films (2009–2022)
 List of Searchlight Pictures films
 List of 20th Century Studios films
 List of Star Studios films
 List of Touchstone Pictures films
 List of Walt Disney Pictures films
 List of Walt Disney Studios Motion Pictures international films
 :Category:Lists of films by studio

Further reading
 List of all films released by Disney regardless of label—Disney D23

External links
 The Walt Disney Studios

Walt Disney Studios (division)
Walt Disney Studios
Walt Disney Studios